Danas Rapšys (born 21 May 1995) is a Lithuanian swimmer. He is a two-time Olympian, a multiple-time Lithuanian record holder in the men's backstroke, freestyle and butterfly, and a double swimming champion at the 2017 Summer Universiade in Taipei, Taiwan. Rapšys is also a member of Panevežys Žemyna Club, and is coached and trained by Ina Paipelienė.

2013 season
In 2013 he became a European Junior champion. At the 2013 FINA World Junior Swimming Championships in Dubai, United Arab Emirates, Rapšys competed in 4×100 metre mixed medley with Rūta Meilutytė, Povilas Strazdas, Eva Gliožerytė. During 4×100 metre mixed medley heats, they finished third with a time of 3:55.74 seconds and qualified to the final. At the 4×100 metre mixed medley final, Meilutyte, Rapšys, Strazdas and Gliožerytė finished second and won silver medal with a time of 3:52.52 seconds. In the 2013 World Aquatics Championships he reached semifinals in the 200m backstroke swimming.

2017 season

2017 Summer Universiade

At the 2017 Summer Universiade in Taipei, Taiwan, Rapšys competed in four events: the 100 metre backstroke, 200 metre freestyle, 200 metre backstroke and 4 × 100 m medley relay.

In his first event, 100 m backstroke, Rapšys achieved bronze medal, with a time of 54:17, but narrowly missed out of the silver medal by five hundredths of a second (0.05) behind Japan's Kosuke Hagino. Rapšys won gold medal in the 200 metre freestyle finals, with a time of 1:45.75, and broke the national Lithuanian swimming record.
He also competed in the 200 m backstroke final where he sat in 7th through the halfway point, but made big moves on the back half, including a 28.87 on the final 50, to pull ahead of the field for gold in 1:56.52.

2022 season
At the 2022 World Short Course Championships, contested in December at Melbourne Sports and Aquatic Centre in Melbourne, Australia, Rapšys won the bronze medal in the 400 metre freestyle with a time of 3:36.26, which was less than two seconds behind gold medalist Kieran Smith of the United States. In the 200 metre freestyle on the sixth and final day of competition, he ranked fifth in the preliminaries with a time of 1:42.21 before placing seventh in the final with a time of 1:41.74.

Personal bests

International championships (50 m)

 Rapšys was disqualified in the final.
 Team Lithuania was disqualified in the preliminaries.

International championships (25 m)

References

External links
 
 
 
 
 

1995 births
Living people
Lithuanian male butterfly swimmers
Lithuanian male backstroke swimmers
Sportspeople from Panevėžys
Swimmers at the 2016 Summer Olympics
Olympic swimmers of Lithuania
Universiade medalists in swimming
Lithuanian male freestyle swimmers
European Aquatics Championships medalists in swimming
Universiade gold medalists for Lithuania
Universiade bronze medalists for Lithuania
Medalists at the 2017 Summer Universiade
Swimmers at the 2020 Summer Olympics
Medalists at the FINA World Swimming Championships (25 m)